Lester Lockett (March 25, 1912 – October 4, 2005) was an American baseball player in the Negro leagues. He played from 1937 to 1948 with several teams.

References

External links
 and Seamheads
Negro League Baseball Players Association page
NLB museum

1912 births
2005 deaths
African-American baseball players
Algodoneros de Torreón players
American expatriate baseball players in Canada
American expatriate baseball players in Mexico
Baltimore Elite Giants players
Baseball players from Indiana
Birmingham Black Barons players
Carman Cardinals players
Chicago American Giants players
Farnham Pirates players
Indianapolis Clowns players
Navegantes del Magallanes players
American expatriate baseball players in Venezuela
People from Princeton, Indiana
St. Louis Stars (1937) players
Winnipeg Giants players
20th-century African-American sportspeople
Baseball infielders
21st-century African-American people